Brouffia is an extinct genus of Late Carboniferous (late Westphalian stage) basal reptile known from Pilsen of Czech Republic. It is known from a single partial skeleton, the holotype ČGH III B.21.C.587 and MP 451 (part and counterpart). It was collected in the Nýřany site from the Nýřany Member of the Kladno Formation. It was first named by Robert L. Carroll and Donald Baird in 1972 and the type species is Brouffia orientalis.

References

Prehistoric reptile genera
Fossil taxa described in 1972
Carboniferous reptiles of Europe
Archaeology of the Czech Republic